The East Baltic race is one of the subcategories of the Europid race, into which it was divided by biological anthropologists and scientific racists in the early 20th century. Such racial typologies have been rejected by modern anthropology for several reasons.

The term East Baltic race was coined by the anthropologist Rolf Nordenstreng, but was popularised by the race theorist Hans F. K. Günther. This race was living in Finland, Estonia and Northern Russia. And was present among Slavic, Baltic, Uralic and even some individual Germanic people (I.E Prussian and Swedish locals who immigrated in the area throughout medieval and early modern history) of the Baltic sea. It was characterised as "short-headed, broad-faced, with heavy, massive under-jaw, chin not prominent, flat, rather broad, short nose with low bridge; stiff, light (ash-blond) hair; light (grey or pale blue) eyes, standing out; light skin with a greyish undertone.

The American Eugenics Society described East Baltic people as being Mongolized.

The Nazi philologist Josef Nadler declared the East Baltic race to be the main source of German Romanticism.  Also in the Third Reich the philologist Julius Petersen wrote that Ludwig Tieck's Romanticism might have been promoted by his possible Slavic heritage, referring to the American biographer Edwin H. Zeydel's theory, that Tieck's grandmother was Russian.

See also
 Scientific racism

References

Baltic peoples
Historical definitions of race